Baron Clark may refer to:
Kenneth Clark - English author, museum director, broadcaster, and art historian
David Clark, Baron Clark of Windermere - British Labour politician and author
William Clark, Baron Clark of Kempston
Anthony Clarke, Baron Clarke of Hampstead

Noble titles created in 1969